Edward M. Langille (born 1959) has been a professor of Modern Languages (French language and literature) at St. Francis Xavier University in Antigonish, Nova Scotia since 1989. He specializes in the area of Enlightenment studies, and is one of Truro’s leading experts on Voltaire and his works. He is the North American correspondent for Société des études voltairiennes, an international organization that promotes and coordinates research, events and publications relating to Voltaire. Langille also specializes in studies of Acadian culture and history.

Edward Langille received his undergraduate degree from Université Sainte-Anne, Nova Scotia's only French language university, in 1980. He earned his most advanced degree, a D.ès.L. (Doctor of Letters), from Université Paris III – Sorbonne Nouvelle in 1987. Langille’s contributions to scholarship and culture were acknowledged by the French Government in 2004, when he was named Chevalier in the Ordre des Palmes Académiques, as well as Chevalier in the Ordre des Arts et des Lettres. On February 1, 2013, he was awarded the Queen Elizabeth II Diamond Jubilee Medal for services to scholarship, education and culture. He also publishes under the name Édouard Langille.

Education and teaching
Edward Langille was born on April 11, 1959 in St. Catharines, Ontario, but grew up in the village of Londonderry Mines in Colchester County, Nova Scotia and attended public schools in the area. He holds six university degrees. He received his Bachelor of Arts degree in modern languages from Université Sainte-Anne in Pointe-de-l'Église, Nova Scotia in 1980 and earned two degrees in French literature, L. ès L. and M. ès L. from the Université de Nantes in 1982 and 1983. In 1984, he was awarded an additional modern languages degree (D.E.A.) from Université Paris III – Sorbonne Nouvelle. The following year, he earned a master's degree in international history from the London School of Economics writing his Master's thesis on the French Socialist party in the years immediately before World War I.  In 1987, Langille completed a doctoral dissertation at Université Paris III – Sorbonne Nouvelle on the medieval French translations of William, archbishop of Tyre, working under the direction of the late French medievalist Jean Dufournet. The title of the thesis is La Représentation de l’Islam et du monde musulman chez Guillaume de Tyr. (The Portrayal of Islam and of the Muslim World in the French Chronicles of William of Tyre.)

After graduating from Sorbonne with his D.ès.L. (Doctor of Letters), Langille taught at the University of Victoria and Université Ste-Anne, before being hired in the Modern Languages department at St. Francis Xavier University in 1989. In 2016, Langille was named to a two-year term as the Jules Léger Research Chair in the Humanities and Social Sciences at St FX. The chair is awarded to a senior faculty member with a strong record of research. He was appointed in 2017 to a prestigious three-year position as contributing editor to The Year's Work in Modern Language Studies (YWMLS).

Scholarly research

Candide: Sources and origins
Edward Langille has conducted extensive research on the sources and origins of Voltaire's 1759 satiric masterpiece Candide. He argues, in part, that Candide draws on Pierre-Antoine de La Place's 1750 novel, Histoire de Tom Jones, ou l’enfant trouvé, a French adaptation of Henry Fielding's The History of Tom Jones, a Foundling.  "A close reading of Candide and L'Enfant trouvé," Langille has written, "reveals an astonishing network of verbal, thematic and narrative analogies, which strongly reinforces the thesis that Voltaire's novel owes a great deal to La Place, in terms of the characters it portrays, the narrative that binds those characters together, and the language in which the whole is expressed." Elsewhere, Langille has noted that La Place's adaptation eliminates Fielding's "consistent, all-pervasive irony" replacing it with "emotional self-indulgence" and conferring "a rosy cast on Fielding's love themes." He argues that Voltaire created Candide as a parody of the contemporary sentimental romance, the prevailing philosophy of Optimism and possibly, Fielding's own faith in "the controlling hand of Providence".

In addition, Langille argues that Candide reflects elements of a second book, Le Cosmopolite; ou, le Citoyen du monde, the memoirs of Louis-Charles Fougeret de Monbron, also published in 1750. Noting the cynical tone, sarcastic humour and salacious sexual allusions of Le Cosmopolite, Langille suggests Monbron's memoirs provided Voltaire with anecdotes, descriptions and idiosyncratic expressions that were useful in creating Candide. Moreover, he writes, parts of Candide are based on Monbron's extensive travels and the many incidents he relates. Langille concludes:

L’Enfant trouvé  gave Candide its original idyllic childhood setting, its principal characters and themes, including the protagonist’s all-important journey of self-discovery, which is also his quest for love...Le Cosmopolite gave Voltaire the idea of a wide-ranging and seemingly random European journey, conferring on Candide the world view that Voltaire clearly wished to emphasize. Still, it is doubtful whether either the optimistic Enfant trouvé  or the cynical Cosmopolite would on their own have provided Voltaire with enough inspiration to write Candide. Rather, it was the mysterious combination of these two works together with a variety of other thoughts and texts in the crucible of Voltaire’s imagination that gave birth to what critics have since baptized 'le moment Candide'.

Langille's most recent book, due to be released in 2013, is a 670-page critical edition of La Place’s translation of Tom Jones with a 66-page introduction and notes. The book signifies a new line of inquiry into Anglo-French civilization in the 18th century as historic translations have not before been considered as vectors or carriers of cross-cultural influence.

Candide sequels
Voltaire's novel, possibly the most-read work in French literature, soon gave rise to imitations. In 2003, Edward Langille published a scholarly edition of a sequel, Candide, ou l'Optimisme, seconde partie (1760) with an introduction and notes. He also edited Candide en Dannemarc, ou l’optimisme des honnêtes gens, (1767) which continues the story of Candide and his new wife in their luxurious Copenhagen townhouse. The edition was released in 2007.

Chéticamp hooked rugs

In July 2011, Langille discovered more than 125 hand-painted designs for hooked rugs in an antique shop in New Glasgow, Nova Scotia. The designs, created by the little-known American artist and teacher Lillian Burke (1880–1952), form part of the unique culture and history of the small, mainly French-speaking community of Chéticamp, Cape Breton. Langille donated the designs to Cape Breton University's Beaton Institute and began conducting extensive research on Lillian Burke's life as well as her contributions to a cottage industry that helped sustain the impoverished community during the Great Depression of the 1930s.

Langille has written that Lillian Burke's connection to Cape Breton began sometime after 1905 when she was hired to tutor the children of Elsie Grosvenor, the eldest daughter of Alexander Graham Bell. In 1914, Burke made the first of many visits to Beinn Bhreagh, Bell's estate near Baddeck, where she learned about Mabel Hubbard Bell's activities on behalf of welfare and social reform. In 1927, after her parents' death, Marian Fairchild, the Bell's youngest daughter, encouraged Burke to revive Cape Breton Home Industries, an organization established by Mabel Hubbard Bell in the 1890s to generate economic development.  Burke then taught the women of Chéticamp new techniques for hooking rugs and supplied them with her own designs. They included floral patterns created by using faded colours to make the carpets look like heirlooms. Burke's designs also featured classical art motifs inspired by the Great Masters as well as patterns based on Navajo blankets and Art Deco geometric shapes. From 1927 to 1940, she marketed great quantities of the finished rugs in New York City, working in collaboration with prominent decorators and interior designers.

Langille's book on Burke's life and career, The Story of Lillian Burke was published in 2019.

Advocacy for cultural heritage

Government House renovation
Aside from his scholarly research and teaching, Edward Langille has demonstrated his concern for preserving Nova Scotia's cultural heritage. In 2008, for example, he wrote to the Lieutenant Governor to complain about renovations to Government House. The Lieutenant Governor's official residence in downtown Halifax was built between 1799 and 1805. Langille's letter criticized the decision to replace old plaster walls with drywall and noted that in England, great pains are taken to restore old buildings to their original condition. "Sadly, in the less noble city of Halifax, where heritage groups are treated with derision, history is carted away in a Dumpster, without public outcry," Langille wrote. The project manager defended the decision by pointing out that plaster in the main foyer, pantry and stairwell contained potentially dangerous asbestos and that replacing it with drywall was much cheaper. He also questioned whether anyone would be able to tell the difference. Langille called that "nonsense" adding that plaster walls give rooms a whole different sound and feel. "There's the whole weight and the sonority of the rooms and the texture of the finish; all of those things come into play. There's absolutely no comparison," he told a journalist. "There's a certain patina that's extremely hard to fudge, and that finish is built up over centuries. It's the difference between an original Tudor brickwork palace and a fake suburban Tudor half-timbered monstrosity."

Lighthouse preservation

The demolition of a wooden lighthouse at Fisherman's Harbour in Guysborough County, Nova Scotia attracted Langille's attention in 2011. In a piece he wrote for the conservation group Heritage Trust of Nova Scotia, Langille reported that the federal Department of Fisheries and Oceans demolished the century-old lighthouse without warning and burned it on the beach as villagers watched in horror. The government then replaced it with "an ugly steel frame" structure. Langille lamented the loss of the small, wooden lighthouse. "The effect of that humble building against the dramatic backdrop of sky and the rugged seacoast was quintessential Nova Scotia, a painter’s dream, the kind of picture seen on a tourist brochure," he wrote. "How can Fisheries and Oceans systematically destroy the built heritage of Nova Scotia? Why is the Federal Government allowed to disfigure the natural and traditional beauty of our seacoast? Why indeed? And what can be done to stop similar vandalism from taking place elsewhere in our province?"

Document donations
In 2010, Langille acquired documents from an antique dealer that had once belonged to Nova Scotia's distinguished Desbarres family and donated them to the province's Public Archives. The documents included a royal land grant or deed to the DesBarres family and a rare early-19th-century plan of the Town of Guysborough. "I acquired them slowly through negotiations over a long, long period," Langille told a reporter, "Finally he agreed to sell them to me at a price I could afford. My objective was to donate them to the public archives. I always felt they belonged in the public archives." Langille added that although people value old objects such as furniture or crockery, they tend not to value old paper artifacts, which are potentially much more interesting. "I know, for example, I have bought, over time, boxes of letters at auctions or sales and you’ll get letters from guys who were overseas for the war writing home. These were all preserved by families and they’ve come down to us and give us an absolute, unique glimpse into someone’s mind into a time in history that is vanishing. There are very few people who are alive today who can talk about it but the letters still keep these things, in a way, fresh."

In 2012, Langille donated a large collection of documents to the Imperial War Museum in London, that once again, he bought from an antique dealer in Nova Scotia. The documents, which include photographs, letters, school work, school reports, diary entries and travel papers, concern the evacuation of two British boys to Massachusetts in 1940 during World War II. The documents suggest that Michael and Robert Wentworth-Shields may have been five and seven at the time of their evacuation. They remained in the U.S. until 1945 in the care of the Shipley family. In 1938, their father, W.F. Wentworth-Shields (also sometimes spelled Sheilds) had published The Empire On Guard, a book about British defence policies. Despite two years of searching, however, Langille could not find members of the family which may have emigrated to Australia after the war.

St. F.X. faculty strike
In January and February 2013, Langille crossed the picket lines when his union, the St. F.X. Association of University Teachers, went on strike for three weeks after eight months without a contract. A few days before the strike, Langille had vowed he would continue to teach classes. A news report quoted him as saying, "I may not have a contract with the university, but my course outline is my contract with students and by God I’ll respect it."  On the first day of the strike, Langille told a CBC Radio interviewer that the union was making excessive demands and that students were being held hostage to a difference of opinion between unions at the university and its administrators. He noted that during his 25 years teaching at St. F.X., campus facilities and salaries had improved immensely and that faculty unhappy with pay levels were free to apply for academic jobs elsewhere.
In an interview posted in five parts on the website of the St. F.X, student newspaper The Xaverian, Langille said he did not believe university faculty should strike for more money. "I really believe, and some people may find this bizarre, but I really believe that a captain doesn’t abandon the ship, a doctor doesn’t abandon the sick, and I really believe the professors shouldn’t abandon students," he added.

Selected publications
 Histoire de Tom Jones, ou l'enfant trouvé (1750). Adaptation de Pierre-Antoine de la Place, éditéé par Édouard Langille. Paris: Classiques Garniers, 2013. [P]
 Voltaire, Aventure Indienne, édition prepare par Édouard Langille, Les Oeuvres Completes de Voltaire, Oxford, Voltaire Foundation, 57A, 2013. [P]
 Voltaire, Les Aveugles, juges des couleurs, édition prepare par Édouard Langille, Les Oeuvres Completes de Voltaire, Oxford, Voltaire Foundation, 57A, 2013. [P]
 Langille, E., The Life and Career of M. Lillian Burke (1880–1952), Journal of the Royal Nova Scotia Historical Society, 2013. [P]
 Fougeret de Monbron, Le Cosmopolite, ou le citoyen  du monde (1750), nouvelle édition préparée avec introduction par É. Langille. Notes et commentaires par É. Langille, Modern Humanists Research Association, spring 2010.
 Candide en Dannemarc ou l’optimisme des honnêtes gens (Genève, 1767) nouvelle édition préparée avec introduction par É. Langille. Notes et commentaires par É. Langille, University of Durham Press-Modern Language Series, 2008. 192p (reprinted 2010 University of Manchester Press)
 Dulaurens, Henri-Joseph, Candide ou optimisme, seconde partie 1760,  nouvelle édition préparée avec introduction  par É. Langille. Notes et commentaires par É. Langille et G. Pink, University of Exeter Press : Textes littéraires, 2003. 89p.
 "La Place, Monbron and the Origins of Candide", French Studies, 2012, Vol. LXVI, No. 1, 12–25.
 "The Making of Candide’s Paquette", Prostitution and Eighteenth-Century Culture: Sex, Commerce and Morality, ed. Ann Lewis, Markman Ellis, forthcoming (Pickering and Chatto: London).
 Langille, E., « L’Histoire de Tom Jones, ou l’enfant trouvé (1750) et la structure narrative de ‘Candide’ », Dix-Huitième Siècle, 43, 2011, p. 653-669.
 Langille, E., ‘Molly, Jenny and Margot, Or the making of Candide’s Paquette’, Romance Notes, 49, 2010, p. 357–366.
 Langille, E., "Candide and Tom Jones: Voltaire perched on Fielding’s Shoulders" in Mentoring in Eighteenth Century British Literature and Culture, ed. Antony W. Lee, (Ashgate, 2009), p. 85–108.
 Langille, E.M., ‘Le Roi des Bulgares’: Was Voltaire’s satire on Frederick the Great just too opaque? in An American Voltaire: Essays in Memory of J. Patrick Lee, ed. E. Joe Johnson and Byron R. Wells (Cambridge Scholars Publishing, 2009), p. 240-52.
 Langille, E.M., Fielding, LaPlace’s Histoire de Tom Jones" and "Candide" in Henry Fielding in Our Time, ed. by J. A. Downie, (Cambridge Scholars Publishing, Cambridge 2008) p. 233–255.
 Langille, E.M. "Voltaire’s satire on Frederick the Great: Candide, his posthumous Mémoires, Scarmentado and Les Questions sur l’Encyclopédie", Romance Notes, Vol. 48 (1), Fall 2007, p. 49–57.
 Langille, É., « L’Histoire de Tom Jones : ou l’enfant trouvé (1750) et  la genèse de Candide », Revue de l’Histoire littéraire de la France, 2008 (2) p. 269–287.
 Langille, É., La Place’s « Histoire de Tom Jones, ou l’enfant trouvé » and « Candide », Eighteenth Century Fiction, 19:3, Spring 2007, p. 267–289.
 Langille, É, Brooks, G.P., « How English Translators have dealt with Candide’s homosexual allusions », Literary Research/Recherche Littéraire, 2001, Vol., 18, No 36, p. 367-88.
 Langille, É., « Allusions to Homosexuality in Voltaire’s ‘Candide’ : a reassessment » Studies on Voltaire and the Eighteenth Century, 2000 : 05 p. 53–63.
 Langille, E., M. Lillian Burke (1880–1952): "Three Lost Chéticamp Carpets", Material Culture Review- Revue de la Culture Matérielle, Vols., 80–81 Fall 2014/Spring 2015, p 1-16.
 Langille E., "The Trials of Lillian Burke", Material Culture Review- Revue de la Culture Matérielle, Vol., 76 Fall/Automne 2012, p. 73–81.
 Langille, E., The Story of Lillian Burke, Boularderie Island Press, Cape Breton, N.S., 2019.

References

1959 births
Academic staff of St. Francis Xavier University
Living people
Literary scholars
Voltaire
Chevaliers of the Ordre des Palmes Académiques
Chevaliers of the Ordre des Arts et des Lettres
Acadian culture
Acadian history